The 2010–11 Magyar Kupa (English: Hungarian Cup) was the 71st season of Hungary's annual knock-out cup football competition. It started with the first match of Round 1 on 7 August 2010 and ended with the Final held on 17 May 2011 at Stadium Puskás Ferenc, Budapest. The winners, Kecskemét, earned a place in the second qualifying round of the 2011–12 UEFA Europa League. Debrecen were the defending champions, having won their fourth cup competition last season.

Qualifying phase

Round 1
Matches were played on 7 and 8 August 2009 and involved the teams qualified through the local cup competitions during the previous season and the Nemzeti Bajnokság III teams.

Round 2
These matches were played between 17 and 18 August 2010 and involved the winners of Round 1 and the 2010–11 Nemzeti Bajnokság II teams.

Round 3
These matches were played between 21 September 2010 and 5 October 2010. The winners of Round 2 were joined by the majority of the 2010–11 Nemzeti Bajnokság I teams; sides involved in a European cup competition were given a bye to the next round.

|}

Round of 32
Entering this stage of the competition were the 28 winners from the previous round and the four clubs which competed in Europe this season. These matches took place between 6 October 2010 and 2 November 2010.

|}

Final stage

Bracket

Round of 16
The sixteen winners of the previous round were drawn into eight two-legged matches. The winners on aggregate advanced to the next round. The first leg matches were played on 9–10 November 2010 with the exception of Kaposvár-Paks, which was played on 16 February 2011; the return legs were played on 1–2 March 2011 with the exception of Honvéd–Eger, which was played on 23 November 2010.

|}

Quarter-finals
As in the previous round, ties were played over two legs. The winners advanced to the semi-finals. The first legs were played on 8–9 March 2011, with the return legs to be played on 15–16 March 2011.

|}

First leg

Second leg 
Kecskemét won 6–2 on aggregate.

ZTE won 2–1 on aggregate.

Videoton won 5–1 on aggregate.

Kaposvár won 5–4 on aggregate.

Semi-finals
Ties in the semi-finals were also played over two legs.

|}

First leg

Second leg 
Kecskemét won 5–1 on aggregate.

Videoton won 5–0 on aggregate.

Final

Top goalscorers

Source: MLSZ (Click on "Góllövő lista", from the third combo box on the left select "Magyar Kupa", from the fourth combo box select "8. forduló" and click on "Lekérés indítása")''

See also
 2010–11 Nemzeti Bajnokság I
 2010–11 Nemzeti Bajnokság II
 2010–11 Ligakupa

References

External links
 Official site 
 soccerway.com

2010–11 in Hungarian football
2010–11 domestic association football cups
2010-11